Thomas Bouvais (born 29 May 1991) is a French para table tennis player who competes in international elite competitions. He has won two-time World medalist and a bronze European medalist in the team events, he has also competed at the 2012 and 2016 Summer Paralympics in both singles and team events but did not medal in either event.

References

External links
 
 

1991 births
Living people
People from Meulan-en-Yvelines
Paralympic table tennis players of France
French male table tennis players
Table tennis players at the 2012 Summer Paralympics
Table tennis players at the 2016 Summer Paralympics
Table tennis players at the 2020 Summer Paralympics
21st-century French people
20th-century French people